Popești-Leordeni is a town in Ilfov County, Muntenia, Romania,  south of downtown Bucharest, although from the northern edge of the town to the southern edge of Bucharest the distance is less than . Most of its inhabitants commute to Bucharest, with Popești-Leordeni being seen as a satellite town of the Romanian capital.

History
Popești-Leordeni was historically the site of two separate villages — Popești (name derived from popă, "priest", akin to the word "pope") and Leordeni (name derived from leurdă, "ramsons" or Allium ursinum).

The villages were first attested during the 16th century: Leordeni was a domain of the Băleanu family of Wallachian boyars, while Popești was included in the lands belonging to ancestors of the chronicler Radu Popescu. The latter was inherited by the Phanariote nobleman known under the name Alexandru Conduratu, who settled it with Bulgarians from around  Nikopol and from the Banat; the newly created locality was named Popești-Conduratu or Pavlicheni, in reference to "Paulicians" (a tradition designated the Roman Catholic group of the Bulgarian community by the names of their ancestors).

Popești and Leordeni were united into a single commune in 1873; boyar lands were divided by successive land reforms, and the Conduratu manor house was passed to the Costa-Foru family (whose member Constantin Costa-Foru was a well-known journalist in the interwar period).

As it stands, Popești-Leordeni is currently a growing suburb of Bucharest, and has seen large developments from the 2010s onwards. However this has come along with criticism of poor urban planning and lack of building permits for its new buildings.

Demographics
 

As of 2002:

Ethnicity
Romanians: 14,915 (98.7%)
Roma: 164 (1.1%)
Hungarians: 12 (0.1%)
Italians: 6 (0.04%)

Language
The inhabitants of Popești-Leordeni have the following languages as their first language:
Romanian: 15,001 (99.3%)
Romani: 80 (0.5%)
Hungarian: 8 (0.05%)
Italian: 5 (0.03%)

Religion
Romanian Orthodox: 9665 (63.9%).
Roman Catholic: 5308 (35.1%)
Other religions or non-religious: 152 (1.0%)

In 1930, 99.2% of the 3,489 inhabitants declared as ethnic Romanians. 63.8% were Roman Catholic, 36.1% Romanian Orthodox.

References

Towns in Romania
Populated places in Ilfov County
Localities in Muntenia
Bulgarian communities in Romania